William Gaius Lapham (February 2, 1934 – November 8, 2016) was an American football center who played two seasons in the National Football League (NFL) with the Philadelphia Eagles and Minnesota Vikings. He was drafted by the Eagles in the fourteenth round of the 1958 NFL Draft. He was also drafted by the Houston Oilers in the 1960 American Football League draft as well as by the Vikings in the 1961 NFL expansion draft. Lapham first enrolled at Drake University before transferring to the University of Iowa. He attended Abraham Lincoln High School in Des Moines, Iowa. He died in Des Moines in 2016 at the age of 82.

References

External links
Just Sports Stats

1934 births
2016 deaths
Players of American football from Des Moines, Iowa
American football centers
Drake Bulldogs football players
Iowa Hawkeyes football players
Philadelphia Eagles players
Minnesota Vikings players